RC Lousã is a rugby union team based in Lousã, Portugal. As of 2022 they play in the honor league. Before that they played in the First Division of the Campeonato Nacional de Rugby from 2012 to 2022 (National Championship).

History
The club was founded by José Redondo, after whom the club's home ground is named.

Their first match at senior level was against now-defunct GD Moitense, with Lousã prevailing 21-18.

External links
RC Lousã

Portuguese rugby union teams